The Sish Taraz is a river in Iran and The river is more than four million years old. The catchment area of this river in the heights of Rivash is approximately 800 square kilometers.

References 

Rivers of Iran